Cristóbal Alberto Vergara Maldonado (born 20 June 1994) is a Chilean footballer that plays for Deportes Santa Cruz as a defender.

Personal life
He is the son of the former footballer Álvaro Vergara, who played for Universidad de Chile in the 1980s.

Honours

Club
 Primera División de Chile (2): 2011 Clausura, 2012 Apertura
 Copa Sudamericana (1): 2011

References

External links
 
 Fussball Talents Profile

1994 births
Living people
People from Temuco
Chilean footballers
Chile youth international footballers
Universidad de Chile footballers
A.C. Barnechea footballers
Deportes Temuco footballers
Deportes Santa Cruz footballers
Chilean Primera División players
Primera B de Chile players
Association football defenders